The Atkinson index (also known as the Atkinson measure or Atkinson inequality measure) is a measure of income inequality developed by British economist Anthony Barnes Atkinson. The measure is useful in determining which end of the distribution contributed most to the observed inequality.

Definition
The index can be turned into a normative measure by imposing a coefficient  to weight incomes.  Greater weight can be placed on changes in a given portion of the income distribution by choosing , the level of "inequality aversion", appropriately. The Atkinson index becomes more sensitive to changes at the lower end of the income distribution as  increases. Conversely, as the level of inequality aversion falls (that is, as  approaches 0) the Atkinson becomes less sensitive to changes in the lower end of the distribution. The Atkinson index is for no value of  highly sensitive to top incomes because of the common restriction that  is nonnegative. 

The Atkinson  parameter is often called the "inequality aversion parameter", since it regulates the sensitivity of the implied social welfare losses from inequality to income inequality as measured by some corresponding generalised entropy index. The Atkinson index is defined in reference to a corresponding social welfare function, where mean income multiplied by one minus the Atkinson index gives the welfare equivalent equally distributed income. Thus the Atkinson index gives the share of current income which could be sacrificed, without reducing social welfare, if perfect inequality were instated. For , (no aversion to inequality), the marginal social welfare from income is invariant to income, i.e. marginal increases in income produce as much social welfare whether they go to a poor or rich individual. In this case, the welfare equivalent equally distributed income is equal to mean income, and the Atkinson index is zero.
 
For  (infinite aversion to inequality) the marginal social welfare of income of the poorest individual is infinitely larger than any even slightly richer individual, and the Atkinson social welfare function is equal to the smallest income in the sample. In this case, the Atkinson index is equal to mean income minus the smallest income, divided by mean income. As in large typical income distributions incomes of zero or near zero are common, the Atkinson index will tend to be one or very close to one for very large .

The Atkinson index then varies between 0 and 1 and is a measure of the amount of social utility to be gained by complete redistribution of a given income distribution, for a given  parameter. Under the utilitarian ethical standard and some restrictive assumptions (a homogeneous population and constant elasticity of substitution utility),  is equal to the income elasticity of marginal utility of income. 

The Atkinson index is defined as:

In other words, the Atkinson index is the complement to 1 of the ratio of the Hölder generalized mean of exponent 1−ε to the arithmetic mean of the incomes (where as usual the generalized mean of exponent 0 is interpreted as the geometric mean).

Atkinson index relies on the following axioms:
 The index is symmetric in its arguments:  for any permutation .
 The index is non-negative, and is equal to zero only if all incomes are the same:  iff  for all .
 The index satisfies the principle of transfers: if a transfer  is made from an individual with income  to another one with income  such that , then the inequality index cannot increase.
 The index satisfies population replication axiom: if a new population is formed by replicating the existing population an arbitrary number of times, the inequality remains the same: 
 The index satisfies mean independence, or income homogeneity, axiom: if all incomes are multiplied by a positive constant, the inequality remains the same:  for any .
 The index is subgroup decomposable. This means that overall inequality in the population can be computed as the sum of the corresponding Atkinson indices within each group, and the Atkinson index of the group mean incomes:
 
The class of the subgroup-decomposable inequality indices is very restrictive. Many popular indices, including Gini index, do not satisfy this property.

See also 
 Income inequality metrics
 Generalized entropy index
 Gini index

Footnotes

References
 Atkinson, AB (1970) On the measurement of inequality. Journal of Economic Theory, 2 (3), pp. 244–263, . The original paper proposing this inequality index.
 Allison PD (1978) Measures of Inequality, American Sociological Review, 43, pp. 865–880. Presents a technical discussion of the Atkinson measure's properties. There is an error in the formula for the Atkinson index, which is corrected in Allison (1979).
 Allison, PD (1979) Reply to Jasso. American Sociological Review 44(5):870–72.
 Biewen M, Jenkins SP (2003). Estimation of Generalized Entropy and Atkinson Inequality Indices from Complex Survey Data. IZA Discussion Paper #763. Provides statistical inference for Atkinson indices.
 Lambert, P. (2002). Distribution and redistribution of income. 3rd edition, Manchester Univ Press, .
 Sen A, Foster JE (1997) On Economic Inequality, Oxford University Press, . (Python script for a selection of formulas in the book)
 World Income Inequality Database , from World Institute for Development Economics Research
 Income Inequality, 1947–1998, from United States Census Bureau.

External links 
Software:
 Free Online Calculator computes the Gini Coefficient, plots the Lorenz curve, and computes many other measures of concentration for any dataset
 Free Calculator: Online and downloadable scripts (Python and Lua) for Atkinson, Gini, and Hoover inequalities
 Users of the R data analysis software can install the "ineq" package which allows for computation of a variety of inequality indices including Gini, Atkinson, Theil.
 A MATLAB Inequality Package , including code for computing Gini, Atkinson, Theil indexes and for plotting the Lorenz Curve. Many examples are available.
 Stata inequality packages: ineqdeco to decompose inequality by groups; svygei and svyatk to compute design-consistent variances for the generalized entropy and Atkinson indices; glcurve to obtain generalized Lorenz curve. You can type ssc install ineqdeco etc. in Stata prompt to install these packages.

Income inequality metrics